Bugatealur is a village in Belgaum district in the southern state of Karnataka, India. This village is located on Kolhapur-Gadhinglaj road. There is a temple of Lord Dattatraya(Narsoba).

References

Villages in Belagavi district